Kristina Barrois and Yvonne Meusburger were the defending champions, but both chose not to participate. 
Megan Moulton-Levy and Ahsha Rolle won the title by defeating Han Xinyun and Lu Jingjing in the final 6–3, 7–6(7–5).

Seeds

Draw

Draw

References
 Main Draw

Emblem Health Bronx Open - Doubles